Gmina Jaworzyna Śląska is an urban-rural gmina (administrative district) in Świdnica County, Lower Silesian Voivodeship, in south-western Poland.

Naming
In the year 1761, during the Seven Years' War, Frederick the Great went into an entrenched mount guard (entrenched camp) close to Bolesławice (de:Bunzelwitz). With 50,000 troops he was up against 132,000 allied Austrian and Russian troops. During the Camp of Bunzelwitz King Frederick II was staying in a tent (de:Zelt). In order to remember to this campaign, the later close to that area established railway station was named Koenigszelt (en: King's tent, today Jaworzyna Śląska). In memory to the Camp of Bunzelwitz there was a memorial stone on the northern end of the station.

Neighbouring gminas
Gmina Jaworzyna Śląska is bordered by the towns of Świdnica and Świebodzice, and the gminas of Strzegom, Świdnica and Żarów.

Villages
Apart from the town of Jaworzyna Śląska, the gmina contains the villages of Bagieniec, Bolesławice, Czechy, Milikowice, Nowice, Nowy Jaworów, Pasieczna, Pastuchów, Piotrowice Świdnickie, Stary Jaworów, Tomkowa and Witków.

Twin towns – sister cities

Gmina Jaworzyna Śląska is twinned with:
 Ostritz, Germany
 Peyremale, France
 Pfeffenhausen, Germany
 Teplice nad Metují, Czech Republic

References

Jaworzyna Slaska
Świdnica County